Aglaia argentea is a species of plant in the family Meliaceae. It is a tree found in Australia, Brunei, India, Indonesia, Malaysia, Myanmar, Papua New Guinea, the Philippines, the Solomon Islands, and Thailand.

Description 
Aglaia argentea is an evergreen tree. It has a spiral leaf arrangement and pinnately compound leaves with leaflets that are elliptical or oblong. Once it has reached a height of about 4.5 meters they begin to flower and fruit.[6] It is a dioecious species so there are male and female plants. The flowers on both are similar, having 5 petals each.[5] The male flowers have 5 stamen and the female flowers have superior ovaries. The fruit are small (between 30 and 35 mm in diameter) oval and fleshy, each containing anywhere from one to three seeds. [3] The tree can grow up to 98ft (30m) and the leaves typically range in size from 17 – 112 cm long and 14 – 75 cm wide. The flowers have a complex inflorescence that can grow up to 60cm long and 60cm wide, with radial symmetry.[5]

Ecology 
A. argentea is found in well-developed rainforests and other humid lowland areas. It grows in wet tropical areas of east Asia, Australia, and some of the Pacific islands. It thrives on full sunlight and moderate amounts of water.[5] It is also successful on many different soil types, such as: basalt, clay, coral sand, granite, limestone and sandstone. This dioecious tree is pollinated by insects and the seeds are commonly dispersed by animals such as birds.[3] The berries that contain its seeds are often eaten by birds and are also cultivated for human consumption.

Cultivation and Uses 
A. argentea produces edible fruits that are often cultivated and eaten without the seeds in East Asia and some of the Pacific islands. The bark of the tree has steroids that were isolated to use as cytotoxins to help with some forms of cancer such as leukemia. [2] A. argentea is also known for a naturally occurring chemical called rocaglamide which contains properties that are useful as insecticides, antifungals, and antibacterial applications.[1] In addition to the antibacterial properties, rocaglamide is also helpful with leukemia much like the steroids mentioned before. Its timber is commonly used as a substitute for mahogany and it is also a great colonizer when regenerating forests and wildlife in areas where rainforests have been destroyed in the past.[3][4]

Common names
Aglaia argentea is known as silver boodyara, bekak, or koping-koping. It is also locally known as iloilo in the Western Visayas in the Philippines. The city of Iloilo (and the Iloilo province) is named after the tree.

References

 C. Satasook, M.B. Isman, F. Ishibashi, S. Medbury, P. Wiriyachitra, G.H.N. Towers, Insecticidal bioactivity of crude extracts of Aglaia species (meliaceae), Biochemical Systematics and Ecology, Volume 22, Issue 2, 1994, Pages 121–127, ISSN 0305-1978,https://doi.org/10.1016/0305-1978(94)90002-7. 
 Farabi, K., Harneti, D., Nurlelasari, M. R., Hidayat, A. C., Supratman, U., Awang, K., & Shiono, Y. (2017). Cytotoxic steroids from the bark of aglaia argentea (Meliaceae). CMU J. Nat. Sci, 16(4), 293–306.
 Tropical Plants Database, Ken Fern. tropical.theferns.info. 2020-11-05. http://tropical.theferns.info/viewtropical.php?id=Aglaia+argentea
 Khaopakro, S., Vajrodaya, S., Siripatanadilok, S., & Kermanee, P. (2015). Wood anatomical survey and wood specific gravity of 13 species of Aglaia (Meliaceae) from Thailand. Thai Forest Bulletin (Botany), (43), 87–103. Retrieved from https://li01.tci-thaijo.org/index.php/ThaiForestBulletin/article/view/44213
 Flora & Fauna Web, A Singapore Government Agency Website. (2020, April 20). Aglaia Argentea Blume. Retrieved from https://www.nparks.gov.sg/florafaunaweb/flora/3/5/3508
 http://portal.cybertaxonomy.org/flora-malesiana/node/13386

argentea
Sapindales of Australia
Flora of tropical Asia
Least concern flora of Australia
Least concern biota of Queensland
Rare flora of Australia
Flora of Queensland
Nature Conservation Act rare biota
Taxonomy articles created by Polbot